Nizhny Karabut is a rural locality (a selo) in Aleynikovskoye Rural Settlement, Rossoshansky District, Voronezh Oblast, Russia. In the 19th century the village was part of Starokalitvyanskaya volost, Ostrogozhsky Uyezd, Voronezh Governorate. The population was 409 as of 2010. There are 7 streets.

Geography 
Nizhny Karabut is located 34 km east of Rossosh (the district's administrative centre) by road. Nikolayevka is the nearest rural locality.

References 

Rural localities in Rossoshansky District